Caraimatta is a genus of araneomorph spiders in the family Tetrablemmidae that was first described by Pekka T. Lehtinen in 1981.

Species
 it contains four species, found in Central America, Jamaica, Cuba, Colombia, and Mexico:
Caraimatta blandini Lehtinen, 1981 – Mexico
Caraimatta brescoviti García, Martínez & Ahumada-C., 2019 – Colombia
Caraimatta cambridgei (Bryant, 1940) – Cuba, Jamaica, Mexico to Panama
Caraimatta sbordonii (Brignoli, 1972) (type) – Mexico, Guatemala

See also
 List of Tetrablemmidae species

References

Araneomorphae genera
Spiders of Central America
Spiders of Mexico
Spiders of the Caribbean
Taxa named by Pekka T. Lehtinen
Tetrablemmidae